Sewa Haji Paroo (1851 in Bagamoyo – 10 February 1897 in Zanzibar) was a businessman of Indian Ismaili origin. He was the main trader for the Sultan of Zanzibar. He also founded and financed the Sewa Haji Hospital which today is part of the Muhimbili Hospital in Dar es Salaam. Sewa Haji is considered the first philanthropist of East Africa. For example, he financed the building of a school, a mosque and several wells in his native Bagamoyo. Also he equipped the famous expedition of Henry Morton Stanley.

Literature
 Robert Gregory: The Rise and Fall of Philanthropy in East Africa. Transaction Publishers, 1991

External links
 history of Muhimbili National Hospital
 biography of Sewa Haji

1851 births
1897 deaths
Tanzanian businesspeople
Tanzanian Ismailis
Indian Ismailis